Newell Orrin Ruston Morrison (July 28, 1924 – July 31, 2013) was a Canadian politician. He served in the Legislative Assembly of British Columbia from 1972 to 1975, as a Social Credit member for the constituency of Victoria.

Newell, a long-time resident of Victoria, British Columbia, was well known as an auto dealer, entrepreneur, MLA for Victoria and CEO of BC Development Corp. His interests included flying, having trained as a WWII RCAF pilot; a lifelong love of cars, travel and most importantly his love of family.

References

British Columbia Social Credit Party MLAs
Politicians from Chongqing
Politicians from Victoria, British Columbia
1924 births
2013 deaths